The Perfect Girl may refer to:
 
The Perfect Girl (2015 film), a Bollywood film
The Perfect Girl (2017 film), a Taiwanese film
My Fair Lady (2003 TV series) or The Perfect Girl, a South Korean television series
"The Perfect Girl", a 2005 story by Israeli writer Guy Hasson
"The Perfect Girl", a song by the Cure from Kiss Me, Kiss Me, Kiss Me

See also
"Perfect Girl", a 2006 song by Kim Wilde
"Perfect Girls", a song by TLC from TLC